(2-Bromophenyl)diphenylphosphine is an organophosphorus compound with the formula (CHBr)P(CH).  It is a white crystalline solid that is soluble in nonpolar organic solvents.  The compound is used as a precursor to the 2-lithiated derivative of triphenylphosphine, which in turn is a precursor to other phosphine ligands.

Preparation
The compound has been prepared by several methods.  An efficient route is the coupling reaction of diphenylphosphine and 2-bromoiodobenzene, which is catalyzed by palladium complexes (Ph = CH):
CHBr(I)  +  HPPh  +  EtN   →   PhP(CHBr)  +  [EtNH]I

The compound is isomorphous with (2-tolyl)diphenylphosphine.

Lithiation with butyl lithium gives o-lithiated triphenylphosphine.  The bromide also forms a Grignard reagent.  These metallated phosphines are versatile reagents.
BrC6H4PPh2  +  Mg   →    BrMgC6H4PPh2
2 BrMgC6H4PPh2  +  PhPCl2   →     PhP[C6H4PPh2]2  +  2 MgClBr

References

Tertiary phosphines
Phenyl compounds
Bromoarenes
Benzene derivatives